North-West North 1 was an English Rugby Union league which was at the tenth tier of the domestic competition and was available to teams in Cumbria and the northern part of Lancashire.  Promoted teams moved up to North-West East/North 1 while relegated teams dropped to North-West North 2 until it was disbanded at the end of the 1989–90 season.  

North-West North 1 ran for five seasons from 1987 to 1992 until it was cancelled by the RFU as part of their north-west league restructuring.  All non-promoted sides from North-West North 1 were transferred into the new Cumbria division (also at tier 10) for the start of the 1992–93 campaign.

Original teams
When league rugby began in 1987 this division contained the following teams:

Blackpool
Carnforth
Creighton
Keswick
Kirkby Lonsdale
Millom
Rossendale
St. Benedict's
Whitehaven
Windermere

North-West North 1 honours

Number of league titles

Keswick (1)
Kirkby Lonsdale (1)
Rossendale (1)
Upper Eden (1)
Windermere (1)

Notes

References

See also
 Cumbria 1
 Cumbria 2
 English Rugby Union Leagues
 English rugby union system
 Rugby union in England

10